Francesco Sivori (1771–22 July 1830) was an admiral of the Kingdom of Sardinia. He was born in Palermo to a Ligurian father. He led a squadron of Sardinian vessels to victory over the Tripolitians during the Battle of Tripoli in 1825.

1771 births
1830 deaths
Italian admirals
Italian military personnel of the Napoleonic Wars
18th-century Italian people